A list of animated feature films first released in 1997.

Highest-grossing animated films of the year

See also
 List of animated television series of 1997

References

 Feature films
1997
1997-related lists